Turturro is an Italian surname. Notable people with the surname include:

 Aida Turturro (born 1962), American actress, cousin of John and Nicholas
 John Turturro (born 1957), American actor and filmmaker
 Nicholas Turturro (born 1962), American actor

Italian-language surnames